Maria Adelaide can refer to:
Marie Adélaïde of Savoy (1685–1712), wife of Louis, Dauphin of France, Duke of Burgundy
Adelaide of Austria (1822–1855), queen consort of Sardinia
Infanta Maria Antonia of Portugal (Maria Antonia Adelaide, 1862–1959), daughter of king of Portugal
Infanta Maria Adelaide of Portugal (1912–2012), daughter of claimant to Portuguese throne

See also 
Maria Adelaide Aglietta (1940–2000), Italian politician
Maria Adelaide Amaral (born 1942), Brazilian writer
Maria Adelaide Ferreira (born 1959), Portuguese singer
Nina Ricci (designer) (born Maria Adélaide Nielli, 1883–1970), Italian-born French fashion designer
Maria Adelaide Sneider (1937–1989), Italian mathematician